656 Squadron AAC is a squadron of the British Army's Army Air Corps. It was chosen as one of the AAC new Apache squadrons and in April 2004 started its conversion to role. The first phase of this completed in October 2004. The squadron was the first operational Apache squadron in the Army Air Corps and was awarded fully operational status along with the remainder of 9 Regiment AAC in June 2005. It is under 4 Regiment AAC as of 2007.

History

Formation and the Second World War
After their formation as 656 (AOP) Squadron on 31 December 1942 at RAF Westley, the squadron deployed to the Far East in support of the 14th Army. 656 Squadron operated from 1943 to 1946 in India, Burma, and the Dutch East Indies. During the War, the squadron was to fly more operational hours than their counterparts in Europe. The squadron was then reduced in size and reformed into 1914 Flight in Malaya during the internal conflict there. During this time, 656 provided support to both the AOP and Air liaison role; this it continued to do throughout the emergency.

In the Army
The squadron then reformed as an AAC Squadron on 1 September 1957. 656 Light Aircraft Squadron's time in the Far East continued with tours in Singapore, Borneo and Hong Kong.

With the exception of 2 flights, the squadron was disbanded in 1977 and finally returned to the UK to be reformed in Farnborough, from where it participated in Operation Agila (Rhodesia) and Operation Corporate (The Falklands War) in 1982.

Falklands War
Following the landings at San Carlos on May 21 and prior to the arrival of 5th Infantry Brigade a week later, three Scouts from 656 Squadron were under the operational command of 3 Cdo Bde RM alongside the six Scouts of B Flight, 3 Commando Brigade Air Squadron RM.<Naval History, Landings at San Carlos Water - Summary of Main Events and Main Units> When 5 Infantry Brigade landed, these three Scouts reverted to under command of 656 Squadron on 1 June and joined up with three additional Scouts from the squadron. During the Falklands conflict, the Scout was engaged in CASEVAC, re-supply and Special Forces insertion roles. One aircraft, XT629, was one of two Scouts of B Flight, 3 Commando Brigade Air Squadron, that was attacked by two FMA IA 58 Pucarás (the only Argentine air-to-air victory in the war) of Grupo 3 near Camilla Creek House, North of Goose Green. XT629 was hit by cannon fire and crashed, killing the pilot and severing the leg of the crewman, who was thrown clear of the wreckage on impact. The second Scout evaded the Pucarás and later returned to the site to CASEVAC the survivor. Another Scout, XR628, of 656 Sqn AAC, suffered a main rotor gearbox failure whilst in a low hover over MacPhee Pond, 8 June 1982. XR628 had taken cover as two pairs of A-4 Skyhawks from Grupo 5 approached, these aircraft later attacked the RFA LSLs Sir Galahad and Sir Tristram at Bluff Cove. Once the threat had passed the pilot Sgt R Kalinski PARA began to climb away, the main gearbox failed at the main input drive and the aircraft made a forced landing at the lakeside in around four feet of freezing cold water. The two crew and three passengers, SSgt Ward NCO AAC Sigs, R D Braithwaite & Airtrooper Colin Badgery (LMG Gun group) – all of whom were Army Air Corps personnel – were picked up by another 656 Sqn Scout piloted by Capt J G Greenhalgh and his crewman air gunner later that day. The aircraft was eventually recovered and airlifted to Fitzroy by Seaking on 11 June, but was subsequently written off on its return to the UK. Following research at the National Archive, Kew, it has been determined that XR628 was the same aircraft that was shot down, 26 May 1964, carrying 3 Para CO Lt Col Farrar-Hockley.

Scouts armed with SS.11 anti-tank missiles were used to great effect during the Falklands campaign. On 14 June 1982, an Argentine 105 mm Pack Howitzer battery dug in to the West of Stanley Racecourse was firing at the Scots Guards as they approached Mount Tumbledown. As the guns were out of range of the Milan ATGWs of nearby 2 Para, their 2IC, Major Chris Keeble, contacted Capt J G Greenhalgh of 656 Sqn AAC on the radio and requested a HELARM using SS.11 missiles to attack on them. As he was engaged in ammunition re-supply, his Scout was not fitted with missile booms. This was in order to reduce weight and increase the aircraft lift capability. Capt Greenhalgh then returned to Estancia House, where his aircraft was refuelled, fitted out, and armed with four missiles in 20 minutes with the rotors still turning. An ‘O’ group was then held with the crews of two Scouts of 3 CBAS and Capt Greenhalgh took off on a reconnaissance mission, while the other aircraft were fitted out and readied. Within 20 minutes, he had located the target and carried out a detailed recce of the area. He fired two missiles at the enemy positions and then returned to a pre-arranged RV to meet up and guide in the other two Scouts. The three aircraft, positioned 100 metres apart, then fired a total of ten missiles (nine missiles hit, one failed) from the ridge overlooking the Argentine positions 3000m away and succeeded in hitting the howitzers, nearby bunkers, an ammunition dump and the command post. The Argentine troops returned mortar fire, a round landing directly in front of Capt Greenhalgh's Scout.

All four occupants were killed, the pilot Staff Sergeant Christopher Griffin, his crewman Lance Corporal Simon Cockton and two passengers from 205 Signal Squadron of the Royal Corps of Signals, Major Michael Forge and Staff Sergeant John Baker. The contributing factors were a lack of an "Identification Friend or Foe" transmitter on the helicopter and poor communication between the army and navy. The number "205" was later painted at the crash site as a memorial.

Subsequent history

After a short stay at Netheravon as part of 7 Regt AAC, the squadron relocated to Dishforth as one of the Anti Tank Squadrons of 9 Regt AAC in 1993. The squadron was chosen as one of the AAC new Apache squadrons and in April 2004 started its conversion to role. The first phase of this completed in October 2004. The squadron was the first operational Apache squadron in the Army Air Corps and reached fully operational status along with the remainder of 9 Regt AAC in June 2005.

The squadron was then moved back to a land role in preparation for deployment. 2006 saw the squadron act as lead aviation for the deployment to Afghanistan in May.

The squadron's deployments to Afghanistan in May 2006 and again in May 2007 have been documented and brought into the public eye by the books of former squadron weapons officer, WO1 Ed Macy, Apache and Hellfire. In 2007, it became part of 4 Regiment, Army Air Corps.

In May 2011, several of its Apache helicopters are deployed on the Response Force Task Group COUGAR 11 deployment. They are now re-deployed to Operation Unified Protector. In October 2013, Apache Helicopters from 656 AAC launched from HMS Illustrious as part of the Response Force Task Group's COUGAR 13 deployment.

See also
 No. 656 Squadron RAF
 1982 British Army Gazelle friendly fire incident
 List of Army Air Corps aircraft units

References

Citations

Bibliography

 Bolia, Robert S. "The Falklands War: The Bluff Cove Disaster" Military Review November–December 2004.
 Masakowski, Yvonne with Malcolm Cook and Jan Noyes. Decision-making in Complex Environments. Cardiff, UK: Ashgate Publishing, 2007. .
 Maslen-Jones, E.W., MC, DFC. Fire by Order: Recollections of Service with 656 Air Observation Post Squadron in Burma. Barnsley, UK: Leo Cooper/Pen And Sword Books, 1997. .
 Warner, Guy. From Auster to Apache: The history of 656 Squadron RAF/AAC 1942-2012. Barnsley, UK: Pen And Sword Aviation, 2013. .

External links

Main Webpage
 656 Squadron Association

Army Air Corps aircraft squadrons
Military units and formations of the United Kingdom in the Falklands War
Military units and formations established in 1957